The 2019 W-League grand final was the final match of the 2018–19 W-League season to decide the champions of women's soccer in Australia for the season.

The match was played between Sydney FC and Perth Glory, at Netstrata Jubilee Stadium, with Sydney FC emerging victorious 4–2.

This was referee Kate Jacewicz's ninth final out of the first eleven seasons of the W-League. The attendance of 6,127 was a record for W-League grand finals.

Teams

Route to the final

Match details

Match statistics

See also
 List of W-League champions

References

Grand final
Soccer in Sydney
A-League Women Grand Finals